Annesley Ashworth Somerville (16 November 1858 – 15 May 1942) was a schoolteacher turned politician.  He taught for forty years before turning to politics, then for twenty years served as a Conservative Party politician in the United Kingdom.

Somerville was born at Ballincollig in County Cork in Ireland and studied mathematics at Queen's College, Cork (BA 1875), and at Trinity College, Cambridge (BA 1880), where he was also a Mathematical Scholar. He then became a schoolmaster, first at Wellington College  and then at Eton College. 

He was elected as Member of Parliament (MP) for Windsor at the 1922 general election, and served until he died in office in 1942.

References

External links 
 
 

1858 births
1942 deaths
Conservative Party (UK) MPs for English constituencies
Members of the Parliament of the United Kingdom for Windsor
UK MPs 1922–1923
UK MPs 1923–1924
UK MPs 1924–1929
UK MPs 1929–1931
UK MPs 1931–1935
UK MPs 1935–1945
People from County Cork
Alumni of University College Cork
Alumni of Trinity College, Cambridge